Thomas Maguire may refer to:

 Thomas Maguire (priest) (1776–1854), Canadian Roman Catholic priest
 Thomas Aquinas Maguire, author and illustrator
 Thomas Herbert Maguire (1821–1895), English artist and engraver
 Thomas Maguire (baseball), American baseball pitcher for the 1894 Cincinnati Reds
 Thomas H. Maguire (1877–1915), American football coach and physician
 Thomas Maguire, convicted of murder, but overturned; see Manchester Martyrs
 Tom Maguire (1892–1993), Irish republican
 Tom Maguire (socialist) (1860s–1895), British socialist, trade union organiser and poet from Leeds
 Tom Maguire (footballer) (1873–1944), Australian rules footballer